Aniol is a name, and may refer to:

Surname
 Hans Aniol, German swimmer
 Katarzyna Gajgał-Anioł (born 1981), Polish volleyball player
  (1938-2015), German politician
  (born 1944), German actor

Given name
 Aniol Rafel (born 1977), Catalan editor and publisher
 Anioł Dowgird (1776–1835), philosopher of the Polish and Lithuanian enlightenment

Places
 Sant Aniol d'Aguja, a Benedictine monastery in Catalonia, Spain
 Sant Aniol de Finestres, a municipality in the comarca of Garrotxa, Catalonia, Spain